Neotama variata, is a species of spider of the genus Neotama. It is endemic to Sri Lanka.

See also
 List of Hersiliidae species

References

Hersiliidae
Endemic fauna of Sri Lanka
Spiders of Asia
Spiders described in 1899